Drew Howard Wrigley (born October 10, 1965) is an American attorney, lawyer, and politician from North Dakota. Wrigley currently serves as the attorney general of North Dakota after being appointed to the position by Governor Doug Burgum following the death of Wayne Stenehjem. Wrigley previously served as the United States Attorney for the District of North Dakota from 2001 to 2009 and again from 2019 to 2021, appointed by President George W. Bush and Donald Trump, respectively. Between his terms as United States attorney, Wrigley served as the 37th lieutenant governor of North Dakota from 2010 to 2016. 

Wrigley was the deputy chief of staff to then-Governor John Hoeven prior to serving in elected office. He has held a variety of roles in  U.S. District Attorneys offices.

Education and early career
A native of Bismarck, North Dakota, Wrigley grew up in Fargo, North Dakota, where he graduated from Fargo South High School. He is a fourth-generation North Dakotan, with roots in Burke County and Walsh County. Wrigley is an honors graduate of the University of North Dakota in Grand Forks, North Dakota, where he graduated cum laude with a Bachelor of Arts degree in economics and a minor in philosophy. Wrigley was an active member of Phi Delta Theta during college. He completed his Juris Doctor at the Washington College of Law of American University in Washington, D.C., where he was active in student government, mentoring programs, and he interned for U.S. Senator Bob Dole.

Career 
After law school, Wrigley served as a judicial law clerk in Delaware, after which he became an assistant district attorney in Philadelphia, serving in that capacity for five years before returning to North Dakota.

U.S. Attorney 
In 2001, President George W. Bush appointed Wrigley to be the United States District Attorney for North Dakota. In this capacity, he was responsible for prosecuting all federal crimes committed in the state. 

Wrigley's most notable case was the Dru Sjodin kidnapping and murder. Capital punishment was abolished in the state of North Dakota in 1973, but because the crime involved crossing state lines, the trial fell under jurisdiction of the federal government, leaving the decision about whether or not to seek the death penalty up to Wrigley, who chose to request the death penalty. He successfully prosecuted Alfonso Rodriguez, a repeat sex offender from Crookston, Minnesota, for the kidnap, rape, and murder of Sjodin (he was sentenced to death on September 22, 2006).

A February 9, 2007, article in the New York Times stated that according to a transcript of the court proceedings, Judge Ralph R. Erickson, who imposed the sentence, said "This is the first time since 1914 that any judge has been confronted with a death penalty sentence in North Dakota or Minnesota...Mr. Rodriguez's senseless and horrendous" act forced an uncomfortable discussion of capital punishment to the forefront.
In addition to personally leading the trial team in the trial that lead to Rodriguez's death sentence, Wrigley successfully argued the case before the Eighth Circuit Court Of Appeals, which upheld, 2 to 1, Rodriguez's conviction and death sentence.

On August 16, 2018, President Donald Trump announced his intent to nominate Wrigley to be the U.S. Attorney for the District of North Dakota. On August 27, 2018, his nomination was sent to the United States Senate. His nomination was not acted upon during the 115th United States Congress. He was renominated in February 2019. On February 28, 2019, his nomination was reported out of committee by voice vote. On April 11, 2019, his nomination was confirmed by voice vote by the full Senate. On April 17, 2019, he was sworn into office as the United States Attorney for a second time.

On February 8, 2021, he was asked to resign to reopen the position for nomination, as is routine during a presidential transition. On February 23, 2021, Wrigley announced his resignation, effective February 28, 2021.

Lieutenant governor 
On November 4, 2010, then-Lieutenant Governor Jack Dalrymple designated Wrigley as his successor once his transition of the governor's office was completed (then-Governor John Hoeven had just been elected to the U.S. Senate). Wrigley was sworn into office on December 7, 2010, following the swearing in of Governor Dalrymple. Dalrymple and Wrigley were elected to full terms in November 2012.

Wrigley's responsibilities as lieutenant governor include presiding over the state senate, overseeing legislative relations, formulating the state budget, and agri-business development.

Wrigley considered running in the 2016 North Dakota gubernatorial election, but ultimately decided not to run.

Attorney general of North Dakota 
On February 8, 2022, Governor Doug Burgum appointed Wrigley as North Dakota Attorney General following the death of former Attorney General Wayne Stenehjem. Wrigley had announced on December 30, 2021, that he would run for a full term in the 2022 election. Wrigley won a full term in the November general election.

Personal life
Wrigley lives in Bismarck with his wife, Kathleen, and their three children.

In 2015, Wrigley acknowledged that he had a brief extramarital affair.

References

|-

|-

|-

1965 births
20th-century American politicians
21st-century American lawyers
Lawyers from Fargo, North Dakota
Lieutenant Governors of North Dakota
Living people
North Dakota Attorneys General
North Dakota Republicans
Politicians from Bismarck, North Dakota
Politicians from Fargo, North Dakota
United States Attorneys for the District of North Dakota
University of North Dakota alumni
Washington College of Law alumni